Tāwharanui Peninsula is a finger of land projecting into the Hauraki Gulf from the east coast of the much larger North Auckland Peninsula of New Zealand. It separates Omaha Bay to the north from Kawau Bay and Kawau Island to the south. The nearest sizable town is Warkworth.

Tāwharanui Regional Park covers 588 hectares of the peninsula's land and Tāwharanui Marine Reserve covers the northern coastal sea. Both are administered by Auckland Council which also owns the regional park.

Geologically the peninsula consists of Waitemata Sandstone on top of folded and uplifted greywacke.

Tāwharanui Marine Park was established offshore of the peninsula in 1981 as New Zealand's first Marine Protected Area. The marine park was replaced by Tāwharanui Marine Reserve in September 2011.

North Island brown kiwi was reintroduced into the area.

History 

Māori lived in the area for over 800 years. The Māori name Tāwhara-nui refers to "the abundant bracts of the kiekie vine". Until the 1870s, the park was occupied by a small hapū (sub-tribe) of the Te Kawerau people called Ngati Raupo. The people lived mainly around the catchment of the Mangatawhiri Stream. A significant pā, Oponui, was near the entrance to the park and above the stream outlet was Pa-hi (meaning "lofty fortified settlement"). Tāwharanui provided a large variety of marine and forest resources. This was celebrated in the saying, "He wha tāwhara ki uta; he kiko tamure ki tai" – "The flowering bracts of the kiekie on the land, the flesh of the snapper in the sea". Waikokowai (Anchor Bay) provided a valued source of kokowai or red ochre, which was used for decorative and ceremonial purposes.

Tāwharanui was sold by the Māori owners in 1873–1877 and developed as a farm by the Martin, Jones and Young families. Kauri timber was milled and manuka cut for firewood for many years. Shingle was extracted for a hundred years, creating the Jones Bay Lagoon. Nine vessels were wrecked on the Tāwharanui coastline between 1871 and 1978. Anchor Bay is named after the anchor of the Phoenix, wrecked in 1879. The Auckland Regional Authority, forerunner of the Auckland Council, purchased the parkland from the Georgetti family in 1973.

Demographics
Tawharanui Peninsula statistical area covers the area east of Warkworth, including Omaha, Point Wells, and Baddeleys Beach-Campbells Beach.

Tawharanui Peninsula had a population of 1,962 at the 2018 New Zealand census, an increase of 342 people (21.1%) since the 2013 census, and an increase of 597 people (43.7%) since the 2006 census. There were 783 households, comprising 966 males and 996 females, giving a sex ratio of 0.97 males per female. The median age was 55.0 years (compared with 37.4 years nationally), with 276 people (14.1%) aged under 15 years, 186 (9.5%) aged 15 to 29, 924 (47.1%) aged 30 to 64, and 579 (29.5%) aged 65 or older.

Ethnicities were 95.1% European/Pākehā, 6.6% Māori, 2.0% Pacific peoples, 1.5% Asian, and 1.4% other ethnicities. People may identify with more than one ethnicity.

The percentage of people born overseas was 19.1, compared with 27.1% nationally.

Although some people chose not to answer the census's question about religious affiliation, 57.6% had no religion, 33.8% were Christian, 0.2% had Māori religious beliefs, 0.2% were Hindu, 0.2% were Muslim, 0.2% were Buddhist and 0.9% had other religions.

Of those at least 15 years old, 390 (23.1%) people had a bachelor's or higher degree, and 195 (11.6%) people had no formal qualifications. The median income was $37,700, compared with $31,800 nationally. 396 people (23.5%) earned over $70,000 compared to 17.2% nationally. The employment status of those at least 15 was that 693 (41.1%) people were employed full-time, 318 (18.9%) were part-time, and 21 (1.2%) were unemployed.

See also
List of marine reserves in New Zealand

References

External links
Tāwharanui Marine Reserve, Department of Conservation
Tāwharanui, Auckland Regional Council
 Tawharanui Open Sanctuary Society Inc.

Beaches of the Auckland Region
Peninsulas of the Auckland Region
Nature reserves in New Zealand
Wildlife sanctuaries of New Zealand
Protected areas of the Auckland Region
Regional parks of New Zealand
Matakana Coast